Stevan Peković (born 13 July 1970) is a Montenegrin former professional basketball player.

Professional career 
A small forward, Peković played for Lovćen, Borovica, Budućnost, Crvena zvezda, Hemofarm, NIS Vojvodina, and Ukrainian team Griffon Simferopol.

Career achievements
 Yugoslav Cup winner: 1  (with Budućnost: 1997–98)

Personal life 
His younger brother Dejan Peković (born 1973) is a Montenegrin former professional footballer.

References

External links
 Stevan Pekovic at eurobasket.com
 Stevan Pekovic at fibaeurope.com
 Stevan Pekovic at proballers.com

1970 births
Living people
KK Borovica players
KK Budućnost players
KK Crvena zvezda players
KK Hemofarm players
KK Lovćen players
KK Vojvodina Srbijagas players
KK Železničar Inđija players
Montenegrin expatriate basketball people in Serbia
Montenegrin men's basketball players
Shooting guards
Small forwards
Sportspeople from Podgorica
Yugoslav men's basketball players